The Mackay School, a Chilean school located in Reñaca, Region of Valparaiso, Chile. Of Scottish origin; it was founded in 1857 by Scottish immigrants. It is considered one of the best academic institutions in the Valparaiso region. Currently it only educates male students.

History 
The Mackay School was founded in 1857 as The Valparaíso Artizan School, with the aim to make available quality education for the children of English, American and especially Scottish craftsmen of limited resources who worked in the factories and railroads of Valparaíso during the middle of the 19th century. 

The school was first located in the "Cerro Alegre" area of Valparaíso. One of the founders of the school was Scot Peter Mackay, who was also the first headmaster. The school had a spectacular welcome, showing why more teachers were needed. One that arrived to reinforce Mackay was George Sutherland. By 1866, the institution counted with more than 140 students. Another educator that arrived was Thomas Somerscales, who was contracted as an arts teacher. Until then, only students who spoke English were accepted. But this tradition would be broken in 1871, when opening the first course for Chilean children who did not speak the English language.

Others 
The purpose of creating the school was to provide a suitable education for the children of the English, the American and especially for those of the Scottish craftsmen who worked in the railway workshops in Valparaíso during the midst of the 19th century. Then, "The Valparaíso Artizian School Society" was put together.

Mr. Peter Mackay, a teacher in Glasgow, Scotland, accepted the post of headmaster and moved to Valparaíso, arriving on 8 October in the year 1857. As the school grew in number, an assistant teacher was required. Mr. George Sutherland arrived to Valparaíso from the "Moray House Training College", Edinburgh. 

Towards the year 1866, the school’s average student number was 180. Mr. Thomas Somerscales was hired as an Arts teacher and he taught for almost 20 years. Parallel to his job at the school, he taught private lessons of painting and drawing.
It was not until 1871 that the first class for Chilean students, with no knowledge of English, was opened.

Notable alumni
Edmundo González Robles, Former Commander in Chief of the Chilean Navy
Alastair MacGregor Martin, rugby union international, captain of Chile and member of 1980 World XV.

References

https://books.google.cl/books?id=MppYDwAAQBAJ&pg=PT99&lpg=PT99&dq=English+athletic+mackay+and+sutherland+school&source=bl&ots=79AQLAAd7S&sig=ACfU3U3lpD14Em9Ta32dOJoI4xO_tAWCyQ&hl=es-419&sa=X&ved=2ahUKEwi48PKwgvLjAhU9JrkGHf2zCqEQ6AEwEnoECAcQAQ#v=onepage&q=English%20athletic%20mackay%20and%20sutherland%20school&f=false

External links 
 The Mackay School
 The Student's Weekly
 Association of British Schools of Chile
 International Baccalaureate Organization

Private schools in Chile
1857 establishments in Chile